Murud-Janjira is the local name of a famous fort and tourist spot situated on an island just off the coastal town of Murud, in the Raigad district of Maharashtra, India.

Origins of the name
The word Janjira is a corruption of the word "jazira", which means "island" in the Arabic language. Murud was once known in Marathi as Habsan ("of the Habshi", that is, the Abyssinians). The name of the fort is a concatenation of the Konkani and Marathi words, "murud" and "Janjiri". The word "morod" is peculiar to Konkani and is absent in Marathi.

Ramrao Patil of Janjira 
Raja Ram Rao Patil was the Patil of Janjira Island and a chief of the Kolis who built this island in the 15th century for Kolis to live on peacefully away from pirates. He built the island after gaining permission from the Sultan of the Ahmadnagar Sultanate but later refused to obey the orders of the Sultan. In retaliation, the Sultan sent his Admiral Piram Khan in 1489 to capture the island. Due to the castle's fortifications, Piram Khan was unable to attack the island conventionally, so he disguised himself as a merchant and requested to stay a night at Janjira. He was granted permission, and he hosted a party under the guise of thanking the Patil. When the Patil and the Kolis were intoxicated, Piram Khan attacked them with his men, who had been hidden in barrels, and captured the island.

Major features 

Janjira is considered one of the strongest coastal forts in India. The fort is approached by sailboats from Rajapuri jetty. It has a small postern gate towards the open sea for escape.

The fort has 26 artillery towers still intact. There are many cannons of native and European make rusting on the towers. Now in ruins, the fort in its heyday was a full-fledged living fort with all the necessary facilities, such as barracks, quarters for officers, a mosque, two small  fresh water ponds and so on.  On the outer wall flanking the main gate, there is a sculpture depicting a tiger-like beast clasping elephants in its claws. 

The palace of the Nawabs of Janjira at Murud is still in good shape.

A special attraction of this fort are 3 gigantic cannons named Kalaal Baangadi, Chavri and Landa Kasam. These cannons were said to be feared for their shooting range. Another gate to the west is sea-facing, called 'Darya Darwaza'.

History 

During its heyday, the island fort boasted 572 cannons.

Visitors can gain access to the Janjira fort from Rajapuri, a small village on the coast. After a short ride in a small boat, one can enter the fort through the main entrance. The fort is oval shaped instead of the usual oblong or square shape. The fort wall is about 40 feet high and has 19 rounded porches or arches, some of which still have cannons mounted on them, including the famous cannon Kalaal Baangadi. These cannons were greatly responsible for repelling oncoming enemies from the sea. Inside the fort walls are the ruins of a mosque, a palace and bath with water channelled from streams. There is evidence that royal ladies occupied quarters here. A deep well, still functional, provides fresh water despite the fort being surrounded by salt water.

On the shore is a luxurious cliff-top mansion, the Palace of the Nawab. Built by the former Nawab of Janjira, it commands a panoramic view of the Arabian sea and the Janjira sea fort.

According to another record, the Abyssinian Sidis established the Janjira and Jafarabad state in early 1100.

According to accounts written by the Portuguese Admiral Fernão Mendes Pinto, the Ottoman fleet that first arrived in Aceh prior to the Ottoman expedition to Aceh led by Kurtoğlu Hızır Reis included 200 Malabar sailors from Janjira to aid the region of Batak and Maritime Southeast Asia in 1539. Later, in 1621, the Siddis of Janjira became exceptionally powerful as an autonomous state to the point that the commander of Janjira, Siddi Ambar the Little, successfully defied his overlord Malik Ambar's attempt to replace him. Siddi Ambar the Little is accordingly considered the first Nawab of Janjira state.

The island fortress was under control of the Adil Shahi dynasty until the reign of Ibrahim II where the Janjira fort was lost to the Siddis.

Major historical figures from Murud-Janjira include men such as Sidi Hilal, Yahya Saleh and Sidi Yaqub. During the rule of Sultan Aurangzeb, Sidi Yaqut received a subsidy of 400,000 rupees. He also owned large ships which weighed 300–400 tons. According to records, these ships were unsuitable for fighting on the open sea against European warships, but their size allowed for transporting soldiers for amphibious operations.

Despite repeated attempts, the Portuguese, the British and the Marathas failed to subdue the Siddis, who were themselves allied with the Mughal Empire. For example, 10,000 soldiers from the Maratha Peshwa Moropant Trimbak Pingle were repulsed by the Janjira army in 1676. The Marathas, led by Shivaji, attempted to scale the  granite walls but failed in their attempts. Shivaji's son Sambhaji even attempted to tunnel his way into the fort and was very close to capturing the fort. His attempt was thwarted when a Mughal army attacked the Maratha capital city, forcing Sambhaji to withdraw his forces from the siege and return to the Maratha capital. He built another sea fort in 1676, known as Padmadurg or Kasa fort, to challenge Janjira. It is located northeast of Janjira. Padmadurg took 22 years to build and is constructed on 22 acres of land.

In the year 1736, the Siddis of Murud-Janjira set out in a battle with the forces of the Peshwa Baji Rao. On 19 April 1736, the Maratha warriors Nanaji Surve and Chimaji Appa attacked the gathering forces in the encampments of the Siddis near Rewas. When the confrontation ended, 1,500 Siddis, including their leader Siddi Sat, were killed. Peace was brokered in September 1736, but the Siddis were confined to only Janjira, Gowalkot, and Anjanwel, with their power greatly reduced. However, Janjira remained unconquered until it became part of Indian territory after independence from the British in 1947.

See also 

 Murud
 List of Indian Princely States
 List of forts in Maharashtra
 Khokri Tombs
 Janjira State
 Jafarabad State
 Maratha Navy
Siege of Janjira(1682)

Sources 
 Imperial Gazetteer of India, 2. A., 26 Bde., Oxford 1908–1931
 Malleson, G. B.: An historical sketch of the native states of India, London 1875, Reprint Delhi 1984
 Schwartzberg, Joseph E., Hrsg.: A historical atlas of South Asia, 2. A., New York/Oxford 1992, 
 http://www.maharashtratourism.gov.in/MTDC/HTML/MaharashtraTourism/TouristDelight/Forts/Forts.aspx?strpage=Murud_JanjiraForts.html Maharashtra - Murud Janjira Forts Official Govt. Page

References 

Konkan
Princely states of India
Muslim princely states of India
Islands of Maharashtra
1490 establishments in Asia
15th-century establishments in India
Sea forts
Forts in Raigad district
Populated places in India
Islands of India